Picene is a hydrocarbon found in the pitchy residue obtained in the distillation of peat tar and of petroleum. This is distilled to dryness and the distillate repeatedly recrystallized from cymene. It may be synthetically prepared by the action of anhydrous aluminium chloride on a mixture of naphthalene and 1,2-dibromoethane, or by distilling a-dinaphthostilbene. It crystallizes in large colorless plates which possess a blue fluorescence. It is soluble in concentrated sulfuric acid with a green color. Chromic acid in glacial acetic acid solution oxidizes it to picene-quinone, picene-quinone carboxylic acid, and finally to phthalic acid.

When intercalated with potassium or rubidium and cooled to below 18 K, picene has been reported to exhibit superconductive properties. However, due to the apparent inability to reproduce this work, the superconducting nature of doped picene has been met with heavy scepticism.

Picene is also a major constituent of the hydrocarbon mineral idrialite.

See also
 Olympicene, which has the same number of rings linked in a different way

References

Polycyclic aromatic hydrocarbons